Professor Achilles Milo is a fictional character appearing in American comic books published by DC Comics.

Publication history
Professor Achilles Milo first appeared in Detective Comics #247 and was created by Bill Finger and Sheldon Moldoff.

Fictional character biography
Achilles Milo is a renowned chemist who turned to crime. He used a variety of chemical and medical-related schemes to kill Batman involving subjecting Batman to a drug that made him afraid of anything bat-shaped. After Robin helped him get over his fear of bats, Batman tracked down Milo at his laboratory and handed him over to the police. While incarcerated, Milo developed a fear of bats.

Upon being apprehended again, Milo gassed Batman with a compound that made him lose his will to live.

When Anthony Lupus visited him for a cure for his unbearable headaches, Milo gave him a drug that was derived from the Alaskan timber wolf which turned him into a werewolf. Milo found that the headaches were causing the lycanthropy and manipulated him into doing his bidding in exchange for a cure. His latest assignment was to help capture Batman and then kill him. When Batman was trapped near Milo's secret laboratory, Milo is told by Anthony to give him the cure before his situation worsens. Milo just orders him to do his job. When Anthony turns into a werewolf, Milo is attacked by him where he is unable to control him and the cure he made was destroyed.

At one time, Milo took control of Arkham Asylum and attempted to make Batman insane with yet another gas. When Batman tried to apprehend him, Milo was overpowered by the mad inmates, who had sided with Batman, and exposed to his own gas which drove him insane, and he spent some time in Arkham Asylum as a patient himself.

Batman consulted Milo on at least one occasion when he needed chemical expertise on a toxin given to him by Joker. After that, Dr. Milo retired from criminal activity. He appeared in Arkham Asylum: A Serious House on Serious Earth where the gas had apparently worn off, but he couldn't convince anyone he was actually sane.

In 52 week 41, Ralph Dibny confronts an emaciated Doctor Milo, who appears without his lower legs and in a wheelchair, which is actually used to disguise the Silver Wheel of Nyorlath.

In Batman R.I.P., a past hallucination induced by Professor Milo's gas is revealed to have inspired Bruce Wayne to create the 'back-up' personality of the Batman of Zur-En-Arrh, a more ruthless Batman personality designed to take over in the event of Bruce Wayne being psychologically attacked in such a manner as to render Batman out of action.

An apparently healed Professor Milo appears as the chief henchman and physician of a returned General Immortus. Professor Milo is now in charge of granting artificial superpowers to Immortus' minions. In this capacity, he's able to internalize the Human Flame's powers, removing his need for a special suit by embedding miniature flamethrowers into his skin. Milo is instructed by General Immortus himself to tamper with the pain receptors of his subject, making his boss able to inflict pain on his creations at will, and, eventually, shut them down completely. His master plan meets a major failure when his last subject Human Flame overcomes his control by sheer will, injures General Immortus, and tortures Milo to get an even more powerful body. Milo is spared since he redirects the Human Flame to S.T.A.R. Labs for experimental treatments. General Immortus asks him to rethink their new strategy for the future.

A still at large Milo (having severed his ties with General Immortus) returns to freelancing, offering his enhancement procedures for a hefty fee. He's contacted by Arthur Pemberton to heal the brain damage earlier inflicted in a fight against the Justice Society of America to his daughter Lorna.

In 2011, "The New 52" rebooted the DC Comics universe. Professor Milo is seen at Arkham Asylum where he leads Professor Pyg to an unpleasant fate. After Maggie Sawyer had interrogated Magpie, Maxie Zeus, and Ten-Eyed Man, all Maggie got out of them is that they blame Professor Milo for what happened. As Professor Milo is at Gotham International Airport preparing to board an airplane to Caracas, he is spotted by police officers causing him to release a vial of chemicals that drive the police officers insane. Batman was able to subdue Professor Milo and interrogate him on who gave him the information and needs to destroy Arkham Asylum. Before Professor Milo can come clean on the culprit, they are attacked by spirits. One of the spirits that attacks Batman and Professor Milo is Mister Bygone who blames Professor Milo for his emaciation and infusion of dark magic. Professor Milo is knocked out by Mister Bygone as Batman leaves with his body when the police arrive. When Batman meets up with Jim Corrigan and Batwing, Professor Milo is punched in the face by Corrigan who tries to get answers out of him as he explains to Batman that Professor Milo tried to summon a demon which enabled Deacon Blackfire to open a hole in Hell. Batman puts two and two together and goes out to find Ra's al Ghul.

In the "Watchmen" sequel "Doomsday Clock", Professor Milo was at Arkham Asylum when Rorschach was incarcerated there by Batman.

Powers and abilities
Professor Milo is an expert at chemistry and alchemy.

In other media

Television
 Professor Achilles Milo appears in series set in the DC Animated Universe (DCAU):
 He first appears in Batman: The Animated Series, voiced by Treat Williams. This version initially works for Roland Daggett and Daggett Industries. In the episode "Cat Scratch Fever", under Daggett's orders, Milo engineers a plague to infect Gotham's stray pet population so the company can profit off of a cure. After Catwoman gets infected, Batman uncovers Milo's plot and cures Catwoman, but Milo escapes. In "Moon of the Wolf", Milo is hired to create an untraceable steroid derived from wolf hormones for Anthony Romulus. When it transforms the latter into a werewolf, the former blackmails him into killing Batman to receive a cure, but Romulus inadvertently destroys it and injures Milo. Following Romulus' defeat and escape, Milo is taken away by the authorities.
 Milo returns in the Justice League Unlimited episode "The Doomsday Sanction", voiced by Armin Shimerman. As of this series, he became a high-ranking member of Project Cadmus, but gets demoted by Amanda Waller after his research into Kirk Langstrom's experiments result in a mutated warthog destroying his lab. In retaliation, he frees Doomsday with the intention of using him to kill Waller, but Doomsday kills him off-screen and leaves to kill Superman instead.
 Professor Achilles Milo appears in the teaser of the Batman: The Brave and the Bold episode "Gorillas in our Midst!", voiced by Dee Bradley Baker. He uses a group of trained rats to steal diamonds to fund his experiments until Batman and the Spectre locate his lab. He attempts to use a strength-enhancing potion, but is defeated and left for the police. However, the Spectre returns, turns Milo into cheese, and releases his rats to devour him off-screen.

Film
Professor Milo appears in a flashback in Scooby-Doo! & Batman: The Brave and the Bold, voiced by Sam Riegel. Years prior, he experimented on a faulty teleportation device that seemingly killed his colleague Dr. Leo Scarlett until Batman discovered Milo's work and defeated him.

Video games
Professor Milo appears as a non-playable character in Batman: Arkham Underworld, voiced again by Armin Shimerman. This version provides his services to supervillains, offering to provide gadgets, upgrade their abilities, and grant them new ones.

See also
 List of Batman family enemies

References

External links
 Professor Milo at DC Comics Wiki
 Professor Milo at Comic Vine

Characters created by Bill Finger
Characters created by Sheldon Moldoff
Comics characters introduced in 1957
DC Comics male supervillains
DC Comics scientists
Fictional chemists
Fictional mad scientists